Zhong is pinyin transliteration of several Chinese surnames, including Zhōng (/), Zhòng,mistakenly for Chóng, cf. :zh:种姓 and Zhòng. These are also transliterated as Chung (especially in Taiwan, Hong Kong and Malaysia), Cheong or Choong (in Malaysia), Tjung or Tjoeng (in Indonesia), and Chiong (in the Philippines).

Origin
Zhōng (/) is the 56th-most-common last name in China. People surnamed Zhong are the descendants of Tang of Shang, the first king of the Shang dynasty. During the Zhou Dynasty, a descendant of Tang of Shang, Wei Zi Qi was made the duke of Song (south of Shangqiu, Henan). A few generations later, Song Heng Gong had a son called Ao. Ao had a grandson Bo Zhong, who was a judge in the Jin kingdom. Bo pleaded for the duke of Jin to repent from his unrighteousness and was executed. His son Zhou Li fled to the kingdom of Chu and became the prime minister. He was awarded the land of Zhongli (northeast of Fengyang, Anhui), and his descendants took the name of the land as their surname. Among them, Zhongli Mei was a general under Xiang Yu. After Xiang Yu was defeated by Liu Bang, Zhongli Mei committed suicide. Mei's son, Jie, fled to Zhangge, Henan, and changed his last name to Zhong. Zhong Jie can be considered as the forefather of the Zhong family.

Notable persons surnamed Zhong

Zhōng /
Arthur Chung, first president of Guyana
Basuki Tjahaja Purnama, former Governor of Jakarta
Betty Chung, Hong Kong actress and singer
Cheong Eak Chong, Singaporean entrepreneur
Gillian Chung (born 1980), Hong Kong singer and actress
Jamie Chung (born 1983), American actress
Jong Chien-wu, Taiwanese football manager
Jong Yeu-Jeng (born 1973),  Taiwanese baseball player
Chung Chun-to, better known as Kenny Bee (born 1953), Hong Kong singer, songwriter, and actor.
Linda Chung (born 1984), Hong Kong singer and actress
Zhong Guiqing (born 1977), Chinese pole vaulter
Zhong Hui (born 225), military general, politician and writer of the state of Cao Wei in the Three Kingdoms period
Zhong Kui, deity 
Zhong Yao, Chinese calligrapher and politician who lived in the late Eastern Han Dynasty
Zhong Chenle (born 2001), Chinese singer based in South Korea, member of NCT Dream
Zhong Naixiong, founder & chairman of Nenking Group, a Chinese conglomerate
Stella Chung, Malaysian singer
Zhong Wanxie, physicist, member of the Chinese Academy of Sciences
Simon Chung, Hong Kong film director
Kym Ng, stage name of Ng Kwee Khim, Singaporean actress
Choong Pei Shan 钟佩珊, Singaporean housewife and murder victim 
Cheng Geok Ha 钟玉霞, Singaporean schoolgirl who was raped and murdered
Cheong Wai Sang (钟伟生), Singaporean convicted rioter and killer

Zhòng 
Zhong You, disciple of Confucius
Zhong Man, Chinese sabre fencer

See also
Zhang (surname)

External links
Chinese surname history: Zhong
Origin of Chinese Family Names (Surnames or Last Names):Zhong

Chinese-language surnames
Multiple Chinese surnames